Khalida Parveen is a Pakistani politician who has been a member of the Senate of Pakistan since March 2012.

Education
She received a Bachelor of Arts from Bahauddin Zakariya University in 1984.

Political career
She was elected to the Senate of Pakistan as a candidate of the Pakistan Peoples Party in the 2012 Pakistani Senate election.

References

Living people
Pakistani senators (14th Parliament)
Pakistan People's Party politicians
Women members of the Senate of Pakistan
Year of birth missing (living people)
Bahauddin Zakariya University alumni
Place of birth missing (living people)
21st-century Pakistani women politicians